The bidding process for the 2019 AFC Asian Cup was the process by which the location for the 2019 AFC Asian Cup that United Arab Emirates was chosen as the hosts. The process officially began on 15 December 2012 and ended on 2 February 2013.

The AFC Competitions Committee confirmed on 12 March 2013 that 11 countries expressed interest in hosting the 2019 AFC Asian Cup: Bahrain, China, Iran, Kuwait, Lebanon, Malaysia, Myanmar, Oman, Saudi Arabia, Thailand and the United Arab Emirates. Lebanon, Malaysia and Myanmar pulled out before the deadline to submit all documents on 31 August 2013.

The tournament will be expanded from 16 to 24 teams.

Bidding process
The bidding procedure and timeline was approved at the AFC congress that was held on 28 November 2012. Presentation files of each bid have to be submitted by 1 May 2013. Following this, inspections of facilities and infrastructure of the bidding nations is expected to be conducted between October and December 2013. Bidding nations will then have to prepare their final presentation by May 2014, the final deadline. The winning bid was originally set to be announced at an AFC congress in June, then November 2014.

At its 60th Anniversary celebrations at the end of 2014, a date of 'summer 2015' was given to when an announcement would be made.

Bids

Iran

After their unsuccessful bid to host the 2011 AFC Asian Cup, Iranian Football Federation president Ali Kafashian stated the renewed intentions for the country to host the 2019 AFC Asian Cup. Iran has previously hosted editions in 1968 and 1976, in which Iran won in both editions. The federation has proposed the use of stadia:  Shahid Bahonar Stadium in Kerman, Nagshe Jahan Stadium in Isfahan, Imam Reza Stadium in Mashhad, Sahand Stadium in Tabriz, Azadi Stadium and Takhti Stadium in Tehran, and Shiraz Stadium in Shiraz.

The following are the host cities and venues selected for Iran's bid:
Isfahan – Naghsh-e Jahan Stadium, capacity 75,000
Kerman – Shahid Bahonar Stadium, capacity 15,403
Mashhad – Imam Reza Stadium, capacity 27,700
Shiraz – Pars Stadium, capacity 50,000
Tabriz – Yadegar-e Emam Stadium, capacity 66,833
Tehran – Azadi Stadium, capacity 78,116
Tehran – Takhti Stadium, capacity 30,122

United Arab Emirates

The United Arab Emirates Football Association also confirmed their bid by handing in their formal bid papers on the final day the Asian Football Confederation would accept applications. If selected, it would be the second time the UAE has hosted the AFC Asian Cup, having hosted the event in 1996. On 29 May 2014, a delegation from the UAE visited the AFC to submit their bid book. This is the nominated stadiums ; The eight venues which used are Zayed Sports City Stadium, Mohammed Bin Zayed Stadium, and Al Nahyan Stadium in Abu Dhabi, Hazza Bin Zayed Stadium and Khalifa Bin Zayed Stadium in Al Ain, Al Maktoum Stadium and Rashid Stadium in Dubai, and Sharjah Stadium in Sharjah.

Abu Dhabi – Zayed Sports City Stadium, capacity 43,206
Abu Dhabi – Mohammed Bin Zayed Stadium, capacity 37,500
Abu Dhabi – Al Nahyan Stadium, capacity 15,000 
Al Ain – Hazza Bin Zayed Stadium, capacity 25,053
Al Ain – Khalifa Bin Zayed Stadium, capacity 12,000
Dubai – Al Maktoum Stadium, capacity 15,058
Dubai – Rashid Stadium, capacity 12,000
Sharjah – Sharjah Stadium, capacity 18,000

Cancelled bids

Bahrain
On 22 January 2013, Bahrain announced their bid for the 2019 AFC Asian Cup, following their success at hosting the 21st Arabian Gulf Cup.
On 2 May 2013, Salman Bin Ibrahim Al-Khalifa became the President of the AFC, which gave added impetus to the Bahraini bid to host the Asian Cup, followed by hosting the World Cup in the next 50 years.
On 7 September 2013, Bahrain announced that they withdrew from bidding to make way for the other GCC national federations who are interested in hosting the quadrennial showcase.

China
On 3 February 2013, China suggested their interest in hosting the competition, On 15 March 2013, the CFA had sent the consultation letter for hosting 2019 AFC Asian Cup to local Associations for the second time, until 7 April 2013, 9 cities had sent hosting request to the CFA, namely Beijing, Dalian, Nanjing, Xi'an, Chengdu, Qingdao, Changsha, Guangzhou and Wuhan. China has previously hosted the edition in 2004.
In September 2013, it was reported that the Chinese Football Association withdrew its bid to "concentrate on our young players' development".

Lebanon
On 24 January 2013, the Lebanese Football Federation announced their bid to host the 2019 AFC Asian Cup. Lebanon previously hosted the edition in 2000. But later they withdrew for the reformation of Lebanese football.

Malaysia
On 10 April 2013, the Football Association of Malaysia (FAM) announced its bid to host the 2019 AFC Asian Cup, with the general secretary of the FAM stating that the country already had the necessary infrastructure to host the event. Malaysia has previously hosted the edition in 2007 along with Indonesia, Thailand and Vietnam

Oman
As well as being confirmed hosts of the inaugural Under 22 Asian Cup and some Under 14 regional qualifiers, Oman has applied to host the 2019 Asian Cup by submitting its bid within the required timeframe. The General secretary of the Oman Football Association has suggested that the national stadium would require upgrading to a capacity of 40,000.

Saudi Arabia
Saudi Arabia also confirmed they would be competing to host the competition, with Prince Nawaf bin Faisal (president of Youth Welfare), saying authorities had approved the Saudi Arabian Olympic Committee's plan. This is the first time it has made a bid to host the Asian Cup.

Thailand
Thailand was the venue for 1972 edition and last hosted in 2007, serving as co-hosts with Malaysia, Vietnam and Indonesia. 5 cities have sent hosting requests to the FAT, including Bangkok, Nonthaburi, Pathumthani, Chiang Mai and Nakhon Ratchasima.

References

External links
AFC website
AFC Asian Cup Official Website

Bids
AFC Asian Cup bids